La Nyalla Mahmud Mattalitti (born 10 May 1959) is a former chairman of the Football Association of Indonesia (PSSI).

He was notorious for leading the Indonesian Football Savior Committee (KPSI) which stood as antithesis of PSSI during the first half of Djohar Arifin Husin's tenure. He is also known as one of the prominent member of Pemuda Pancasila, Indonesian paramilitary organization which has imaged as a political gangster organization

He was a staunch supporter of Prabowo Subianto and his party Gerindra since the 2009 presidential election until 2018. He denounced his support by saying that Prabowo and the party demanded him to pay Rp40 billion (around $2.5 million) for the East Java gubernatorial nomination in the 2018 election. He then supported Prabowo's and once also his political rival Joko Widodo in the 2019 national election, later apologizing for spreading hoax that stated Widodo is a communist. In the same election, he ran for a seat in the Indonesian Senate from East Java.

LaNyalla's political career in the Regional Representative Council of the Republic of Indonesia (DPD RI), when he was elected as a member of the Regional Representative Council of the Republic of Indonesia in the 2019 election from the electoral district of East Java. The vote acquisition reached 2.2 million more. LaNyalla was elected as Chairman of the DPD RI by outperforming three other candidates, Nono Sampono, Mahyudin, and Sultan Baktiar Najamudin.
Lanyalla wants to create a representative function of the DPD RI by building communication and absorbing aspirations, problems faced by regional governments. Make a real contribution through the settlement of the Central Government.
His efforts to bring the DPD RI closer to the regions were manifested through a tagline that became the Senators' working spirit, 'Dari Daerah untuk Indonesia'. He and all the other DPD members are determined to make the DPD a regional 'advocate', with a priority scale on three essential issues, First, accelerating regional development. Second, an increase in the regional fiscal independence index and the equal distribution of community prosperity in the regions.

Education
 SD Bhinneka Bhakti, Surabaya (1965–1971)
 SMP Negeri 1 Surabaya (1971–1974)
 SMA Negeri 3 Surabaya (1974–1977)
 Faculty of Engineering, Brawijaya University

Employment history
 Managing Director of PT. Airlanggatama Nusantara Sakti
 Commissioner of PT. Airlangga Media Cakra Nusantara
 Commissioner of PT. Pelabuhan Jatim Satu (East Java One Port Companies)
 Operator call center Tahajjud Call's

Organizations
 Chief of Regional Leadership Council of Pemuda Pancasila in East Java
 Treasurer of GM Kosgoro East Java
 Treasurer of the Regional Representatives Council (DPD) of the National Youth Committee of Indonesia (KNPI) East Java
 Chairman of East Java HIPMI
 Deputy Treasurer of DPD Golkar East Java
 Chairman of the Regional Representatives Council (DPW) Patriot Pancasila Party of East Java
 Chairman of the East Java branch of the Patriot Party
 Chairman of the DPW Association of Indonesian Consultants (ASKONI) East Java
 Chairman of the Council of the National Association of Construction Employers (GAPEKNAS)
 Chairman of the Council of the Expert Construction Association of Indonesia (ATAKI)
 Chairman of the East Java Chamber of Commerce (Kadin)
 Vice Chairman of the National Sports Committee of Indonesia (KONI) East Java Province
 Chairman of the Board of the Province (Pengprov) PSSI East Java	
 PSSI Executive Committee Executive Committee member	
 Chairman of KPSI
 Vice Chairman of PSSI
 Chairman of PSSI
 Chairman of DPD RI

References

1959 births
Living people
Bugis people
People from Jakarta
University of Brawijaya alumni
Football Association of Indonesia officials
Speakers of the Regional Representative Council